"Each Tear" is a song performed by American R&B recording artist Mary J. Blige. It was released as the second international single from her ninth studio album, Stronger with Each Tear. The song is originally sung by just Blige on the US version of her album though on the re-release and on international releases the song is a featured duet to reflect each of the international markets.

Release and promotion
The song was re-recorded with several different artists to reflect the international markets. It is featured on editions of the album with one of five people: with Jay Sean for the UK and other countries; for Italy with Tiziano Ferro; for Australia, Vanessa Amorosi; on the Canadian release it features K'naan and for Germany it features Rea Garvey.

The Italian version was released to the Italian iTunes Store on February 26, 2010. The German release with Rea Garvey was released on May 7 as a digital download and was released on June 18 as a CD single. The UK version with Jay Sean was released on May 9, 2010.

Music video
The music video was filmed in Los Angeles by director Marcus Raboy. A different edit of the song is used for each version of the song but essentially the videos feature the same black and white scenes with the guest vocalist appearing alongside Blige. The video for Italian version featuring Tiziano Ferro was the first to be released on March 24, 2010 which was followed by the release of the UK version with Jay Sean on April 1, 2010. The German version premiered on Vevo on April 20, 2010.

Formats and track listings
US/Canadian digital download
 "Each Tear" - 4:17

 Italian digital download
 "Each Tear" (featuring Tiziano Ferro) - 4:17

 German digital download
 "Each Tear" (featuring Rea Garvey) - 4:15

 UK/International digital download
 "Each Tear" (featuring Jay Sean) - 4:17

Chart performance
On March 18, 2010 the single made its first worldwide chart debut by appearing on the Italian charts at number six. The following week it peaked at number one where it stayed for one week. It then fell to number three and number six over the following weeks but on April 15, 2010 it rose again to position number three.

Charts and certifications

Year-end charts

Certifications

Release history

References

   

2010 singles
Mary J. Blige songs
Songs written by Mary J. Blige
Jay Sean songs
K'naan songs
Tiziano Ferro songs
Vanessa Amorosi songs
Contemporary R&B ballads
Music videos directed by Marcus Raboy
2009 songs
Geffen Records singles
Songs written by Supa Dups
Soul ballads
2000s ballads